The 13th Maryland Infantry was a regiment of infantry from the State of Maryland that fought on the Union side during the American Civil War.

It was organized March 1, 1865, and was designated 13th Regiment Infantry April 8, 1865 for 2 months service on May 29, 1865 due to the end of the war. It was organized in Frederick, Maryland, and was composed of men from Maryland and veterans from the 1st Maryland Infantry, Potomac Home Brigade. The commanding officer was Colonel Rodger E. Cook.

The unit was stationed at Martinsburg, West Virginia to protect the section of the Baltimore and Ohio Railroad that stretched between Martinsburg and Harpers Ferry, West Virginia.

During the regiment's short time in existence seven soldiers died and forty-five soldiers deserted.

References

Units and formations of the Union Army from Maryland
1861 establishments in Maryland
Military units and formations established in 1861